Wolfgang Faber (born 11 October 1943) is a German weightlifter. He competed in the men's lightweight event at the 1972 Summer Olympics.

References

External links
 

1943 births
Living people
German male weightlifters
Olympic weightlifters of East Germany
Weightlifters at the 1972 Summer Olympics
People from Sächsische Schweiz-Osterzgebirge
Sportspeople from Saxony
20th-century German people